Ferry flying is the flying of aircraft for the purpose of returning to base, delivery to a customer, moving from one base of operations to another or moving to or from a maintenance facility for maintenance, repair, and operations.

A commercial airliner may need to be moved from one airport to another to satisfy the next day's timetable or facilitate routine maintenance; this is commonly known as a positioning flight or repositioning flight, and may carry revenue freight or passengers as local aviation regulations and airline policies allow. They may also be necessary following a major weather event or other similar disruption which causes multiple cancellations across an airline's network resulting in many aircraft and crew being 'out of position' for normal operations; the 2010 eruptions of Eyjafjallajökull or the mass evacuation of US airspace following the 9/11 attacks being significant examples of this.

Ferry permit
A ferry permit is a written authorization issued by a National Airworthiness Authority to move a non-airworthy civil aircraft from its present location to a maintenance facility to be inspected, repaired and returned to an airworthy state.

Ferry pilots
Louise Sacchi flew single- and multi-engine planes 340 times across both the Atlantic and Pacific oceans, breaking several records in the process.

Other notable ferry pilots include:
 Helen Marcelle Harrison Bristol
 Lettice Curtis
 Maureen Dunlop de Popp
 Mary Ellis, WWII pilot in the United Kingdom
 Luis Fontés
 Joan Hughes
 Amy Johnson
 Jim Mollison (Amy Johnson's husband)
 Robert Neale
 Robert Olds
 Jarvis Offutt
 Jadwiga Piłsudska
 C. W. A. Scott
 Diana Barnato Walker

See also
 Air Transport Auxiliary
 Dead mileage, a similar concept in ground transportation
 Ferry range
 RAF Ferry Command
 United Kingdom aircraft test serials
 Women Airforce Service Pilots

References

Further reading
 

Aircraft operations
Aviation by mission